Philipp II Ernst, Count of Schaumburg-Lippe (5 July 1723– 13 February 1787) was a ruler of the counties of Lippe-Alverdissen and Schaumburg-Lippe.

Early life
He was born at Rinteln the son of Friedrich Ernst, Count of Lippe-Alverdissen (1687-1777) and his wife Elisabeth Philippine von Friesenhausen (1696-1764). His father was the son of Count Philipp Ernest I, the founder of the Lippe-Alverdissen line of the House of Lippe and his wife Duchess Dorothea Amalia of Schleswig-Holstein-Sonderburg-Beck (1656-1739).

Biography
He succeeded his father as Count of Lippe-Alverdissen in 1749 and ruled until he inherited the Schaumburg-Lippe territories following the death of his cousin William on the 10 September 1777. He reigned as Count until his death on the 13 February 1787 when he was succeeded by his only surviving son Georg Wilhelm.

Marriages and children

He was married firstly on the 6 May 1756 at Weimar to Princess Ernestine Albertine of Saxe-Weimar (1722-1769), the daughter of Ernest August I, Duke of Saxe-Weimar. From this marriage he had four children:

 Count Clemens August (1757-1757) 
 Count Karl Wilhelm (1759-1780) 
 Count Georg Karl (1760-1776) 
 Countess Friederike Antoinette (1762-1777)

He was married secondly on the 10 October 1780 at Philippsthal to Landgravine Juliane of Hesse-Philippsthal (1761-1799), daughter of William, Landgrave of Hesse-Philippsthal. They had four children:

 Countess Eleonore Luise (1781-1783) 
 Countess Wilhelmine Charlotte (1783-1858) married Count Ernst zu Münster, Minister of Hanover, parents of Prince Georg Herbert zu Münster.
 Count Georg Wilhelm (1784-1860), later (first) Prince (Sovereign) of Schaumburg-Lippe. 
 Countess Karoline Luise (1786-1846)

External links
Schaumburg-Lippe Nobility

 

1723 births
1787 deaths
People from Rinteln
House of Lippe
People from Schaumburg-Lippe
Counts of Germany